General elections were held in Malta between 12 and 14 December 1953. The Malta Labour Party emerged as the largest party, winning 19 of the 40 seats. However, the Nationalist Party formed a government with the Malta Workers Party on 9 January 1954 with Giorgio Borġ Olivier continuing as Prime Minister.

Background
The Nationalist Party-Workers Party government led by Giorgio Borġ Olivier had been defeated in the Legislative Assembly vote on a budget motion on 9 October 1953. This led to the three Workers Party ministers resigning from the cabinet on 12 October. Following discussions with party leaders, the Assembly was dissolved by Governor Gerald Creasy on 15 October. Elections were called, and the Nationalist Party ministers remained in office as a caretaker government.

The election was contested by five parties; the Nationalist Party, the Workers Party, the Malta Labour Party, the Constitutional Party and the Progressive Constitutionalist Party, and were held using the single transferable vote system.

Results

References

General elections in Malta
1953 in Malta
Malta
December 1953 events in Europe
1953 elections in the British Empire